Stephanie Pinola is a film producer and screenwriter based in Los Angeles. She is a graduate of the University of Southern California. Pinola produced the feature film Fishing Without Nets, which won the Best Directing Award in the U.S. Dramatic Category at the 2014 Sundance Film Festival on January 17, 2014.

References

External links

American film producers
Living people
Year of birth missing (living people)
Place of birth missing (living people)
American women in film
American women screenwriters
University of Southern California alumni
American women film producers
21st-century American women